Charles Louis Joseph Vandame (born 4 June 1928) is a French Jesuit, ordained into priesthood on 7 September 1960. He was the Archbishop of N'Djamena from his appointment in 1981 until retirement on 31 July 2003. He was followed by Chadian Matthias N'Gartéri Mayadi.

References

External links 
 Catholic Hierarchy

1928 births
Living people
People from Colombes
Chadian Roman Catholic archbishops
21st-century Roman Catholic archbishops in Africa
French Jesuits
Chadian Jesuits
Jesuit archbishops
French emigrants to Chad
Roman Catholic archbishops of N'Djaména